Mario Rodríguez Bañuelos (born 18 March 1991 in Zapopan, Jalisco) is a Mexican former professional footballer who last played for Inter Playa del Carmen.

External links
 
 

Living people
1991 births
Mexican footballers
Association football midfielders
Atlas F.C. footballers
Club Celaya footballers
Inter Playa del Carmen players
Liga MX players
Ascenso MX players
Liga Premier de México players
Footballers from Jalisco
People from Zapopan, Jalisco